Experimental jazz big bands.

A
Aardvark Jazz Orchestra
Muhal Richard Abrams Orchestra
Neil Ardley's Kaleidoscope of Rainbows
Darcy James Argue's Secret Society

B
Berlin Contemporary Jazz Orchestra
Anthony Braxton's Creative Orchestra Music
Willem Breuker Kollektief
Brotherhood of Breath
Brussels Jazz Orchestra

C
Carla Bley Band
Centipede

D
Bill Dixon Orchestra
Pierre Dørge's New Jungle Orchestra

E
Either/Orchestra
Don Ellis Orchestra
Gil Evans Orchestra

F
Flat Earth Society
Satoko Fujii Orchestra

G
Michael Gibbs Orchestra
George Gruntz Concert Jazz Band
Glasgow Improvisers Orchestra
Globe Unity Orchestra
The Vinny Golia Large Ensemble
Gordon Goodwin's Big Phat Band

H

Hard Rubber Orchestra
Julius Hemphill Big Band

I
ICP Orchestra
Italian Instabile Orchestra

J
The Thad Jones/Mel Lewis Orchestra
Jazz Composer's Orchestra ( Jazz Composer's Orchestra of America)

K
Jeff Kaiser Ockodektet
Stan Kenton and the Innovations Orchestra

L
Liberation Music Orchestra
London Jazz Composers Orchestra
Loose Tubes

M
Tina Marsh and the Creative Opportunity Orchestra
The Microscopic Septet
Mingus Big Band
David Murray Big Band

N

Nucleus
Paal Nilssen-Love's Large Unit

O
Orange Then Blue

P
William Parker & The Little Huey Creative Orchestra

R
Sun Ra and his Arkestra
George Russell and the Living Time Orchestra

S
Sam Rivers and the Rivbea All-Star Orchestra
Scratch Orchestra
Seatbelts
Shibusashirazu Orchestra
Maria Schneider Orchestra

T
Cecil Taylor's Orchestra of Two Continents

V
Ken Vandermark's Territory Band
Vienna Art Orchestra

W
Mike Westbrook Orchestra

References

 
Experimental big bands